Hridi Huq (born July 28) is a theater and television actress, playwright and director from Dhaka, Bangladesh. Hridi Huq is noted as the Organizing Secretary of Nagorik Nattyangon and Executive Member of Bangladesh Group Theater Federation. In 2018, she became the Joint General Secretary of Director's Guild for consecutive second term.

Personal life 
Hridi Huq is the daughter of theatre activist parents Lucky Enam and Enamul Haque. She has a sister, Proitee Huq, who is also a theater activist.

Huq is married to actor Litu Anam since 2005. Together they have twin children, Auniruddho Unmon and Aunoshua Hridi.

Works

References

Living people
Bangladeshi actresses
Bangladeshi television actresses
Year of birth missing (living people)
People from Dhaka